James Stanley Lyons Mitchell (born 19 October 1946) is a former Irish first-class cricketer.

Life
Mitchell was born at Cullion in County Tyrone in October 1946, and was educated at Foyle College in Derry. He first played club cricket for Donemana, before moving to Belfast to study at Queen's University, where he joined the university cricket club. 

Mitchell made his debut for Ireland in a minor match against the Netherlands at Amstelveen on Ireland's 1974 tour of the Netherlands. Later that year, he made a single appearance in first-class cricket for Ireland against Scotland at Alloway. Playing as a middle order batsman, Mitchell batted twice in the match. He was dismissed in Ireland's first-innings for 2 runs by Jack Clark, while in their second-innings he was dismissed by Frank Robertson for 27 runs. 

He later moved to Dublin, where he played club cricket for Phoenix. Outside of cricket, Mitchell runs his own business called Dublin Grass Machinery. 

After retiring from playing, he became a national selector, and in 2005 he served as president of the Irish Cricket Union, helping to organise the 2005 ICC Trophy, which Ireland hosted.

References

External links

1946 births
Sportspeople from County Tyrone
People educated at Foyle College
Alumni of Queen's University Belfast
Irish cricketers
Cricketers from Northern Ireland
Irish cricket administrators
Irish businesspeople
Living people